Virginia Crawford may refer to:

Virginia Crawford, vaudeville performer in the United States who became Virginia Liston after marrying fellow performer Dave Liston
Ginnie Crawford (born Virginia Powell, 1983), American athlete
Virginia Mary Crawford (1862–1948), British Catholic suffragist and writer